Paddy Duffy (November 12 1864 – July 10 1890) was an American boxer of Irish descent. He was considered the first world welterweight champion of boxing's gloved era.

Boxing career highlights
Paddy Duffy was born on November 12, 1864 to an Irish-American family in Boston.  According to one source he worked for a while in his youth as a bootblack or shoeshine in a Boston West End saloon.  He began his career as a boxer around 1883.

Duffy won his first professional fight by knockout over Skin Doherty around February 1, 1884 at the age of 19.

In 1884, he fought three bouts with Paddy Sullivan in Massachusetts with the first two ending in draws, and the third on June 28, 1884 ending in a six round win by points decision in Gloucester according to the Boston Daily Globe.  The bout was fast and hotly contested but the referee ruled in Duffy's favor.

He lost to hard hitting Jack McGee in Boston on December 19, 1884 in a fast second round knockout before a crowd of around 100.  Both contestants were Boston natives, though McGee was four years older.  After this rare knockout loss, Duffy lost only once more in his career.

Black boxer Walter Edgerton, better known as "Kentucky Rosebud" fell to Duffy in a four round points decision in Philadelphia on July 28, 1886.  Though Duffy towered over his opponent, Edgerton gave an even fight in the third scoring with a right to the side of his opponents head near the end of the round.  The fit black boxer stood up to considerable punishment in the short contest and used agility and speed to avoid many of the blows he received in the first round.  Duffy dominated the first two rounds, knocking his opponent to the mat in the first, and though the fourth began cautiously, he backed Edgerton against the ropes inflicting a rain of blows.  Edgerton performed a double shuffle at the end of the bout, and though he often entertained during his matches, he was a serious pugilist.

Duffy fought Billy Frazier to a four round draw on January 14, 1887 at the Adelphi Ring in New Bedford, Massachusetts.  Additional meetings, fought as exhibitions took place with Frazier that winter and into the spring.  Frazier was a well-known short, muscular, scientifically skilled boxer, who would later teach boxing at Harvard College.

Duffy drew with Bill Dunn on March 1, 1887 at the Theatre Comique in Philadelphia.  The bout was close, with intense fighting on both sides, particularly in the third round, when Duffy went frequently to Dunn's mid-section.  The fourth saw Duffy scoring frequently again to Dunn's midsection, and at least twice to his eye, though he was not quite able to finish him due to clinching.  The Times of Philadelphia felt Duffy had the better of the bout by a shade, but the referee called a draw to the close contest.

He fought a four fight series with Jack McGinty in Boston in 1887, which ended in a seven round win on April 19, two seven round draws in  May and October, and an eight round draw on November 17, 1888.  The club which sponsored their bout did not allow more than eight round bouts.  Duffy defeated McGinty on February 9, 1888, by a ninth technical knockout before a crowd of around 300.  The match had been close until McGinty broke his thumb in the ninth, and was forced to retire at the end of the round.  McGinty had seemed exhausted by the end of the sixth, but recovered enough to fight on. The Boston Globe, recognizing the skill of both boxers, considered their 1888 meeting an American welterweight championship.

Duffy won a fourth round technical knockout against Tom Murphy on May 10, 1888. In a close bout, Duffy staggered Murphy at the close of the second that may have allowed him to subsequently end the bout, if not for the closing bell.  Making it clear the match was nearing an end, Duffy dominated the third, punching Murphy across the ring, with little return, and putting him down twice for brief counts.  In the fourth, a right from Duffy sent Murphy down for a long count of twelve, and when he arose, Duffy put him to the mat four additional times.

In a bout with Charles Gleason, on January 7, 1889, Duffy was given "the fight of his life", in a ten round points decision in Boston.  The official ruling was a draw, but Gleason proved a hard hitter and a clever sparrer and was game throughout the match.  Gleason seemed to do his better work in the later rounds, pushing the judges to make the draw ruling.

Taking the world welterweight championship, October, 1888
Duffy fought an important bout against William McMillan on October 30, 1888, winning from a seventeenth round foul, around Fort Foote, Virginia, South of Washington D.C.  McMillan had taken the championship of both Lancastershire England against Tom Keenan and of Scotland against Tom Kelly around 1887.  Both competitors wore thin, skin tight gloves.  As a result of McMillan's championship status, Duffy claimed the world welterweight championship after his victory, though it was recognized mostly in the United States at the time.  After the fourteenth round, Duffy clearly dominated the fighting with brutal blows to McMillan.  The bout was fought before an audience of around 100 near the shore of the Potomac for a purse of around $350 and lasted around one hour and eight minutes.  Duffy was not considered seriously injured after the bout, except for his hands, though McMillan was considered in a dangerous condition from the long and brutal exchange, with serious swelling in his right eye.  According to the Saint Paul Globe, and other sources the fight was called from a foul when McMillan headbutted Duffy in the final round, though head butting fouls by McMillan may have started as early as the eleventh round.  According to one source, the actual fighting took place in an old barn with a ring, six miles south of Washington D.C.

Securing the championship against Tom Meadows, March, 1889
He secured the world welterweight title against British-born Australian champion Tom Meadows on March 29, 1889 in an exhausting 45 round bout at San Francisco's California Athletic Club.  The purse was $1,000, and light gloves were used.  One reporter wrote that spectators lost interest when both fighters occasionally ceased boxing in the latter rounds, with Meadows leaning on a post, and Duffy folding his arms in the center of the ring.  It would have been deadly in a forty-five round bout for both boxers to have been in continuous combat.  Meadows was down four times in the forty-third round and three times more in the forty-fourth. According to Chicago's Inter-Ocean, McMillan fouled when he realized he could not win the bout, and started as early as the tenth round.  Duffy won from a disqualification in the final round that was caused by a head butt from Meadows according to the San Francisco Chronicle.  Meadows was weak and groggy by the forth-fifth and clinching frequently, which gave him greater opportunity to butt with his head.  The referee agreed when Duffy's seconds claimed the head butting foul.

According to Cyber Boxing Zone, Duffy fought three additional fights in 1889, an exhibition with Patsy Kerrigan on April 24, a no decision bout with Jimmy Conley in May, and a second no decision benefit bout with Johnny Reagan in Brooklyn on August 26, though these bouts were less well publicized.

Death at 25 from tuberculosis
Just over a year after his win over Tom Meadows, while still reigning champion, he died of tuberculosis, then known as consumption, on July 10, 1890, at the age of 25, at his home at 5 Endicott Court in North Boston.  He had been diagnosed with an incurable lung and heart ailment around six months earlier, though may have suffered from the illness for at least a year.  Friends attributed his health problems to his boxing career, particularly his last brutal bout with Tom Meadows where he received frequent blows to his chest.  He ended his career with a 33-3-21 win-loss-draw record with 18 knockout victories. He was inducted into the International Boxing Hall of Fame in 2008.

Professional boxing record

All Newspaper decisions are regarded as “no decision” bouts as they have “resulted in neither boxer winning or losing, and would therefore not count as part of their official fight record."

See also
Lineal championship
List of welterweight boxing champions

References

|-

External links

International Boxing Hall of Fame Bio

1864 births
1890 deaths
19th-century deaths from tuberculosis
American male boxers
Welterweight boxers
American people of Irish descent
Boxers from Boston
International Boxing Hall of Fame inductees
Tuberculosis deaths in Massachusetts